This is a list of Belarusian bands.

A
 Amaroka
 Angry Rose 2000
 Aquamorta

B
 B:N: (Б:Н:)
 BeZ bileta
 Bieły Son
 Bristeil
 Bonda

C
 Contredanse
 Čyrvonym pa biełym

D
 Detidetey
 DeadMarsh
 Dreamlin
 Dying Rose
 Daj Darogu

E
 Evoking Winds

H
 Hair Peace Salon
 Hluki

G
 Garadzkija
 Guda

I
 Imperator
 IOWA
 IQ48
 INCITY
 Indiga
Intelligency

J
 J:морс
 Jitters

K
 Kamajedzica
 Kamelot
 Krama
 Krambambula
 Kraski
 KRIWI

L
 Litesound
 Lituus
 Lyapis Trubetskoy

M
 Martin S.
 Miascovy čas
 Morfe`
 Molchat Doma 
 Mroja

N
 N.R.M.
 Naviband
 Nebulae Come Sweet
 Neuro Dubel
 Nevma
 Novaje Nieba
 Nürnberg

O
 Obayanie nevovlechennosti
 Open Space

P
 P.L.A.N.
 Palac
 Parason
 Partyzone
 peoro
 Pesniary
 Pomidor/OFF

R
 Rasta
 Renuen
 Reido
 RIMA
 Razbitae Serca Pacana

S
 Serdce duraka
 Stary Olsa
 Sinie Gory

T
 Tarpach
 Tav.Mauzer
 Termin X
 Tok Rukoo
 Troica

U
 ULIS
 UltraVožyk
 Uria

V
 Vicious Crusade
 Vector Ego
Vegetables
 Vojstrau

W
 WZ-Orkiestra

Z
 ZERO-85
 Zet
 ZM99
 Znich
 Žygimont VAZA

See also
 Music of Belarus

Lists of bands